Piața Romană (Romanian for "Roman Square") is a metro station in central Bucharest, located in the square with the same name, on the main north–south axis of the city centre.

According to Sorin Călinescu, one the three planners of the station, when shown the plans for the Line M2 in 1985, First Lady Elena Ceaușescu reportedly demanded the station's removal. According to some of the people who worked on the station, Ceaușescu was supposedly concerned that workers and students were starting to gain weight and needed more exercise. The engineers realized the station would be necessary, and Sorin Călinescu claimed they have built it in secret. Because of this, the platforms are somewhat asymmetrical, very narrow (less than 1.5 m wide) and the waiting area is in a corridor separated by thick walls from the platforms in order to sustain the station's structure.

While subways ran past without stopping for about a year, thousands of residents reportedly wrote to petition for a station, which was opened on 28 November 1988. It was added to the previously opened extension from Piața Unirii to Pipera.

References

Romana
Railway stations opened in 1988
1988 establishments in Romania